Kian Shahr (also Romanized as Kīān Shahr and Kīyān Shār; also known as Shahrak-e Pābdānā) is a city & capital of Toghrol Al Jerd District, in Kuhbanan County, Kerman Province, Iran.  At the 2006 census, its population was 6,503, in 1,555 families.

References

Populated places in Kuhbanan County

Cities in Kerman Province